Seo Shin-ae (born October 20, 1998) is a South Korean actress. She made her entertainment debut in 2004 in a commercial for Seoul Milk. Seo then became known as a child actress, notably in the film Meet Mr. Daddy (2007), and the television dramas Thank You (2007), Grudge: The Revolt of Gumiho (2010), and The Queen's Classroom (2013).

Filmography

Television series

Web series

Film

Variety show

Music video

Theater

Discography

Awards and nominations

References

External links
 Seo Shin-ae at Dain Entertainment
  
 
 
 

1998 births
IHQ (company) artists
Living people
People from Hwaseong, Gyeonggi
South Korean child actresses
South Korean television actresses
South Korean film actresses
South Korean Protestants
Sungkyunkwan University alumni